Themistians may refer to:

Asteroids of the Themis family
Agnoetae, Christian sect founded by Themistius Calonymus